Old Residence is an historic building in the English city of York, North Yorkshire. A Grade II* listed building, located at 6 Minster Yard, at its junction with College Street, the building dates to the early 18th century, but it was raised and reroofed in 1786, as well has receiving a small extension in the late 19th century.

References

An Inventory of the City of York V Central, (1981), p. 163

External links

A 3D view of the building's proximity to York Minster – Google Maps

Minster Yard
Houses in North Yorkshire
Buildings and structures in North Yorkshire
18th-century establishments in England
Grade II* listed buildings in York
Grade II* listed houses
18th century in York